Naval Station Rota, also known as NAVSTA Rota , is a Spanish-American naval base commanded by a Spanish Rear Admiral. Located in Rota in the Province of Cádiz, NAVSTA Rota is the largest American military community in Spain, housing US Navy and US Marine Corps personnel. There are also small US Army and US Air Force contingents on the base.

History

NAVSTA Rota has been in use since 1953, when Spanish dictator Francisco Franco strengthened relations with the United States as a move to relax international sanctions imposed by the United Nations since 1945.

The Chief of Naval Operations deployed Submarine Squadron 16 (SUBRON 16) to Rota on 28 January 1964 and embarked upon .  completed its first Fleet Ballistic Missile (FBM) deterrent patrol with the Polaris missile and commenced the first refit and replenishment at Rota. During the early 1970s, the submarines assigned to SUBRON 16 were completing conversion to the Poseidon missile. That transition was completed when  returned to Rota on 14 January 1974. Treaty negotiations between Spain and the United States in 1975 resulted in a planned withdrawal of SUBRON 16 from Spain, and the Chief of Naval Operations ordered studies to select a new refit site on the East Coast of the United States. The US Senate ratified the treaty in June 1976; it called for the squadron's withdrawal from Spain by July 1979. In November 1976 the Secretary of the Navy announced Naval Submarine Base Kings Bay, Georgia as that new refit site.

At its peak size in the early 1980s, NAVSTA Rota was home to 16,000 sailors and their families, to include two permanently forward deployed aviation squadrons, Fleet Air Reconnaissance Squadron Two (VQ-2) and Fleet Logistics Support Squadron Twenty four(VR-24). VQ-2 was based at Rota from 1959 until 2005, when it relocated to NAS Whidbey Island, Washington.  VR-24 flew the C-130F and was based at Rota from 1962 until its inactivation in 1993. Through the early 1990s, a patrol squadron of P-3 Orion aircraft based in the United States would also be split-based between NAVSTA Rota and the Naval Air Facility at Lajes Air Base in the Azores to track Soviet naval vessels and submarines in the Atlantic Ocean and in the Mediterranean. The patrol squadrons would rotate this deployment assignment to Rota and Lajes every six months and were augmented by Naval Air Reserve patrol squadrons for shorter durations on a periodic basis.

With the downsizing of the US Navy during the late 1980s and early 1990s, especially after the end of the Cold War, the base's population dramatically declined. There are about 4,000 Americans in Rota, including military, civilians, and their families.

As the US Navy started to reduce its presence, the USAF realized the potential of the airfield as a refueling stop in Middle East deployments. Rota was used by C-5 and C-141 planes in the Gulf War in 1991. Later, the US agreed with Spain to improve air base installations so it could handle more cargo plane operations.

In April 2011, the commander of the US Navy garrison at the base, Captain William F. Mosk, was relieved of command and reassigned during an investigation into illegal drug use by US servicemen at the installation.  Rear Admiral Tony Gaiani relieved Mosk for "lost confidence in his ability to command", specifically, to handle issues related to the investigation.

On October 5, 2011, US Secretary of Defense Panetta announced that the USN will station four Aegis warships at Rota to strengthen its presence in the Mediterranean Sea and bolster the missile defense of NATO as part of the European Phased Adaptive Approach (EPAA).

In 2021 the base temporarily hosted thousands of Afghan refugees transported by the 2021 Kabul airlift. One of the agreements that emerged from the 2022 NATO Madrid summit was to expand the US destroyers stationed at the base from 4 to 6 and 600 more troops.

Overview

Naval Station Rota is home to an airfield and a seaport; the airfield has often caused the base to be misidentified as "Naval Air Station Rota".  The base is the headquarters for Commander, US Naval Activities Spain (COMNAVACTSPAIN), as well as a primary gateway for Air Mobility Command flights into Europe.

Naval Station Rota is strategically located near the Strait of Gibraltar and at the halfway point between the United States and Southwest Asia. Because of this ideal location, the base is able to provide invaluable support to both US Sixth Fleet units in the Mediterranean and to USAF Air Mobility Command units transiting to Germany and Southwest Asia. The Base and its tenant commands are located within the boundaries of the  Spanish "Base Naval de Rota". Under the guidance of the Agreement for Defense Cooperation, the US and Spanish navies work together and share many facilities. The US Navy has the responsibility for maintaining the station's infrastructure, including a  airfield, three active piers, 426 facilities and 806 family housing units.

From Naval Station Rota Spain, the VLF-transmitter Guardamar, which uses Torreta de Guardamar, the tallest man-made structure in the European Union as antenna, is telecontroled. Pest management is performed by a combination of Navy personnel, and local contractors who must be licensed by the host country (Spain).

Occupants
The base is used jointly by Spain and the United States. It remains under the Spanish flag and is commanded by a Spanish Vice Admiral. While the Spanish Navy is responsible for external security of the base, both Navies are charged with internal security. NAVSTA Rota is technically a tenant facility of the Rota Spanish Navy base. As a result, certain US military customs are not observed, such as the display of a US Flag, which is only allowed during the annual Fourth of July celebration or occasionally at half mast as a mark of respect with the ad-hoc permission of the Spanish Admiral.

Spanish Navy
This Base houses the Fleet Headquarters and the Naval Action Force, as well as the main operational units of the Navy: Naval Action Group 2, Aircraft Flotilla, 41st Escort Squadron.

Deployed ships
 Naval Action Group 2
 Juan Carlos I (L-61)
 Galicia (L51)
 Castilla (L52)
 41st Escort Squadron
 Santa María frigate (F81)
 Victoria frigate (F82)
 Numancia frigate (F83)
 Reina Sofía frigate (F-84)
 Navarra frigate (F85)
 Canarias frigate (F86)

US Navy
Naval Station Rota provides support for US and NATO ships; supports the safe and efficient movement of US Navy and US Air Force flights and passengers; and provides cargo, fuel, and ammunition to units in the region. The Naval Station is the only base in the Mediterranean capable of supporting Amphibious Readiness Group post-deployment wash-downs. The base port also offers secure, pier-side maintenance and back-load facilities. Rota supports Amphibious Readiness Group turnovers and hosts Sailors and Marines from visiting afloat units. The base also provides Quality of Life support to Morón Air Base, ARG support sites at Palma de Majorca, NATO headquarters in Madrid and the Military Sealift Command's Maritime Prepositioning Squadron 1.

The mission of US Forces at Rota, as well as other US Navy installations in the Mediterranean such as NAS Sigonella and Souda Air Base is to provide Command, Control and Logistics Support to US and NATO Operating Forces. These three facilities are undergoing a transformation from Maritime Patrol Aircraft airfields to multi-role “hubs” providing crucial air-links for USAF strategic airlift and mobility in support of US European Command (EUCOM), Central Command (CENTCOM) and African Area contingency operations under CENTCOM, EUCOM and the evolving Africa Command (AFRICOM).

Tenant Commands and Forward-deployed ships
 Destroyer Squadron 60 (COMDESRON 60)
 
 
 
 
 United States Navy Explosive Ordnance Disposal Mobile Unit Eight
 Helicopter Maritime Strike Squadron Seven Nine (HSM-79) "Griffins",  Flying the Sikorsky MH-60R Seahawk

Operational Headquarters for the EU Naval Force
The Operational Headquarters (OHQ) for the EU Naval Force moved from Northwood, UK to Rota and to Brest, France on 29 March 2019. EU's Operation Atalanta is commanded from Naval Station Rota.

Opposition

Since the 1980s, various leftist and activist pacifist groups have marched annually to protest the presence of US and Spanish military personnel and equipment at the port of Rota.  The most common path marches alongside the seaside streets of the town to protest at the individual US (NAVSTA Rota), Spanish (Base Naval de Rota) and joint gates, where representatives of the groups read proclamations in favour of peace and freedom.

Gallery

See also
 US Naval Advance Bases
 Morón Air Base

References

External links
 Base Naval de Rota. Spanish Navy Website
 U.S. Naval Station Rota, Spain website

 Video links
 

Naval Stations of the United States Navy
1953 establishments in Spain
Airports in Andalusia
Buildings and structures in Andalusia
Military installations established in 1953
Spanish Navy bases
Spain–United States military relations